is a castle located in Kameoka, Kyoto Prefecture, Japan. It guarded the northwest passage into Kyoto for nearly three hundred years.

The castle was built by Oda Nobunaga's vassal Akechi Mitsuhide because he needed a front base to conquer Tanba region.　He set out for Honnō-ji(Honnō-ji Incident) from the castle in 1582. After the Meiji period revolution, all the remaining structures of the castle were removed or destroyed.

In 2019, Akechi Mistuhide`s statue was built in the castle.

Further reading

References 

Castles in Kyoto Prefecture
Former castles in Japan
Ruined castles in Japan
Akechi clan